SuperCops Vs SuperVillains is an Indian crime detective supernatural television series which aired on the channel Life OK. The show was produced by Fireworks Production.

Before the series was revamped on 24 December 2016, it was originally a detective anthology series about a group of police officers (called SuperCops) who were engaged in saving their city and its citizens from dangerous villains and fictitious creatures.

Cast
 Ashok Samarth as ACP Gajanan Mazgaonkar
 Aman Verma as ACP Diler Kumar
 Shakti Anand as Commander Jagatveer Rana
 Harsh Chhaya as ACP Jairaj
 Hasan Zaidi as Senior Inspector Gautam
 Iris Maity as Inspector Lara
 Kapil Arya as Sub-Inspector Aditya
 Karishma Modi as Senior Inspector Kashish
 King Mal Khan as Inspector Rajhans
 Amit Pachori as SuperCop Ranveer
 Manit Joura as SuperCop Jaywant Rane / Dhvani Chor
 Nitin Chauhaan as SuperCop Jogi Sikander     
 Aamir Dalvi as Kavi
 Meer Ali As Supercop Inspector Anurag Mirza
 Sangram Singh as Sub-Inspector Sangram
 Sarwar Ahuja as Senior Inspector Shaurya / RoboCop 
 Simran Sachdeva as Sub-Inspector Damini
 Vedita Pratap Singh as Mirror Girl (Lamla Mota) / Balwinder "Babli" Kaur (Supercop's Forensic Expert)
 Zaan Khan as Supercop Ashumu (Ashu) 
 Zohaib Siddiqui as Sub-Inspector Vikas / Namish (The Tantric Baba)
 Pankaj B.Singh as Supercop Mayank Desai
 Mala Salariya as Supercop Inspector Abha / Jaadugarni Janvi
 Dakssh Ajit Singh as Senior Inspector Samrat
 Deepak Sandhu as Inspector Karunesh
 Dhananjay Mandrekar as Sub-Inspector Chandan
 Lalit Bisht as Supercop Inspector Param
 Harshad Arora as SuperCop Jai
 Ragini Nandwani as Adonia, the Vampire Princess
 Vaishnavi Dhanraj as SuperCop Shaina
 Ankit Raaj as Veer, the Vampire Prince 
 Rohit Choudhary as Khajoora, Werewolf king
 Gavie Chahal as Lahuman
 Swati Kapoor as Dhara, Angel
 Neetha Shetty as Bichchuki (The Scorpion Woman) 
 Parul Chaudhary as Raj Mata (Vampire Queen) 
 Saar Kashyap as Vampire General
 Vicky Batra as Gogaan, a werewolf 
 Rahil Azam as Dr. Yudhishtir / Professor Vichitra Vidyut
 Kanishka Soni as Sheila
 Aashish Kaul as Makrand
 Aham Sharma as Dr.Ajay (Vidyut – The Flash Man) 
 Saar Kashyap as Brickman
 Amit Mistry as Mirror Man (Nick Sabarwal) 
 Amit Sareen as Mastaan 
 Amit Tandon as Sumit
 Anand Suryavanshi as Dr. Dev
 Anjali Mukhi as Suhasini
 Anjali Rana as Anjali Diler Kumar (ACP Diler Kumar's Wife) 
 Anurag Sharma as Shiv (The Machine Man) 
 Avtar Gill as Captain Kumar 
 Bharat Chawda as Kara (The Time Stopping Villain) 
 Chetan Hansraj as Danny
 Darshan Dave as Dr. Samarth
 Divyaalakshmi as Bulbul (Inspector Kavi's Wife)
 Gurpreet Bedi as Damyanti (Aghor's Mistress) / Rani Zaffara / SuperCop Hetonwita
 Jineeth Rath as Koko
 Jiya Khan as Tina
 Kishwer Merchant as Trisha (Supervillain Tarot Card Reader)/ Tanzia (Centipede Queen)
 Kunal Pant as Sushant Shrivastav (Fire Man) / Vicky (Zodiac Warrior Gemini) / Vinayak (Vini Pagla) 
 Madan Lal as himself, cricket expert
 Madhura Naik as Shikha Yashvardhan
 Manasi Salvi as Advocate Tanisha
 Manish Goel as Dr. Vikram (Sand Man) / Dhir and Kalachakra (Dhir) 
 Milind Gunaji as ACP Pratap Yashwantrao Teje
 Mohan Kapoor as Yashvardhan / Dakran (A Gangster and Jaywant's real father) 
 Mohit Dagga as Kaal (The Melter Man) and Shamsher Hyderabad Kowaal 
 Narendra Jha as ACP Karanveer
 Navi Bhangu as Mobo-Monster (The Mobile Villain) 
 Nikhil Arya as Rangeela (The Painting People Aliver)/ James 
 Ojaswi Oberoi as Megna (The Telekinetic Girl) / Vidhi / Neha
 Payal Rohatgi as Comic Villain (Gong)
 Piyush Sahdev as Senior Inspector Abhigyan
 Pooran Kiri as Rustam (Pizza Shop Owner) / Dr. Sunil 
 Rituraj Singh as DCP Kamalkant
 Rohit Bakshi as Dr.Danny (The Ice Man) / Manu (The Romantic Assassin)
 Rohit Purohit as Varun Kashyap (Elastic Man)
 Sachin Verma as ACP Digvijay
 Sandeep Anand as Billu (The Gas Man)
 Shaleen Bhanot as Dr. Shizal (Episode 82)
 Sheetal Dabholkar as Dr. Saloni
 Siraj Mustafa Khan as Jhumlat (The Dream Assassin)/ Vihaan (The Menacing Magician) 
 Smriti Khanna as Nisha
 Swati Kapoor as Miss Kitty / Sona / Pranali (A Healer) 
 Omar Vani as Professor Shekhar (Bird Man) / Kashmir Police Inspector Omar Vani 
 Varun Buddhadev as Nonu
 Vinod Singh as Arjun 
 Vishal Kotian as Rohan (Magnetic Man) / Atrangi
 Vishal Puri as Dr.Bedi (The Human Weapon Creator) 
 Vishal Thakkar as Jagan (The Fire-Fly Man)
 Rucha Gujarathi as Sameera
 Meghan Jadhav as Mayo (Inspector Lara's Younger Brother)
 Sameksha as Queen Mrignaynee
 Priya Shinde as Forensic Expert
Vibhuti Sharma as Roshni ( Mayank's girlfriend )   
Priyanka Chhabra as Samyra         
Priyanka Singh as Mona
 Bijay Singh as baba fehmi the Egypt's mummy

Production 
The first series aired from 15 January 2012– 15 December 2013 and was originally named "Hum Ne Li Hai...Shapath" which broadcast 250 episodes. The show was then renamed on 21 December 2013, having renamed as "SuperCops vs Supervillains" and entered the science fiction and supernatural genre. It ended in February 2017.

See also
List of programs broadcast by Life OK

References

External links
 Official Website on hotstar

2012 Indian television series debuts
2017 Indian television series endings
Hindi-language television shows
Life OK original programming
Television shows set in Mumbai